Hobetsu Dam  is a rockfill dam located in Hokkaido Prefecture in Japan. The dam is used for irrigation. The catchment area of the dam is 70.5 km2. The dam impounds about 109  ha of land when full and can store 10330 thousand cubic meters of water. The construction of the dam was started on 1970 and completed in 1985.

References

Dams in Hokkaido